Brad Michaleski is a Canadian provincial politician, who was elected as the Member of the Legislative Assembly of Manitoba for the riding of Dauphin in the 2016 election. He is a member of the Progressive Conservative party.

References 

Living people
21st-century Canadian politicians
Progressive Conservative Party of Manitoba MLAs
Year of birth missing (living people)